The Polish Academy Life Achievement Award is an honorary Polish Film Award bestowed by the Polish Film Academy for outstanding contributions to the cinema of Poland.

Recipients
 1999: Wojciech Has
 2000: Andrzej Wajda
 2001: Stanisław Różewicz
 2002: Tadeusz Konwicki
 2003: Roman Polanski
 2004: Kazimierz Kutz
 2005: Jerzy Kawalerowicz
 2006: Jerzy Hoffman
 2007: Witold Sobociński
 2008: Janusz Morgenstern
 2009: Jerzy Wójcik
 2010: Jerzy Stefan Stawiński
 2011: Tadeusz Chmielewski
 2012: Janusz Majewski
 2013: Danuta Szaflarska
 2014: Kazimierz Karabasz
 2015: Franciszek Pieczka
 2016: Janusz Gajos
 2017: Sylwester Chęciński
 2018: Jerzy Stuhr
 2019: Krzysztof Zanussi
 2020: Maja Komorowska
 2021: Jerzy Matuszkiewicz
 2022: Jerzy Skolimowski
 2023: Jan A.P. Kaczmarek

References

External links
 Polish Film Awards; Official website  

Polish film awards